Dimetropus is a reptile ichnogenus commonly found in assemblages of ichnofossils dating to the Permian to Triassic in Europe and North America. Analysis of trackways of Dimetropus provides evidence that the tracks were left by diadectids or non-therapsid synapsids ("pelycosaurs").

References

Reptile trace fossils